"Tiempo Pa Olvidar" is a song recorded by Spanish singer Abraham Mateo and American singer Becky G. It was released by Sony Music Spain on June 19, 2020, as the third single from Mateo's sixth album Sigo a Lo Mío (2020).

Music video
The music video was released on June 19. It was directed by Mike Ho.

Charts

Weekly charts

Year-end charts

References

2020 singles
2020 songs
Songs written by Abraham Mateo
Becky G songs
Songs written by Becky G